With a Lifetime to Pay is the first and only album from Californian punk rock band Zero Down. It was released in February, 2001 on Fat Wreck Chords.

Track listing
All songs written by Zero Down.
"The Way It Is" – 2:48  
"No Apologies" –  2:27  
"Bite the Hand That Feeds" –  2:21  
"Empty Promised Land" –  2:53  
"Going Nowhere" –  2:55  
"It Ain't Over Yet" –  2:07  
"Everybodies Whore" –  2:20  
"Suck Seed" –  1:44  
"Temptation" –  2:47  
"Never Gonna Be the Same" –  2:11  
"Self Medication" –  3:18  
"The Best" –  1:05  
"A Million More"  – 2:38
"Down This Road" (Bonus track, digital only) – 2:20

Personnel
 Jim Cherry – bass, vocals
 John McCree – guitar
 Milo Todesco – drums
 Produced by Ryan Greene
 Engineered by Ryan Greene and Adam Krammer

External links
Fat Wreck Chords album page
Aversions.com album article

2001 debut albums
Zero Down albums
Fat Wreck Chords albums
Albums produced by Ryan Greene